Eocheon Station is a station on the Suin-Bundang Line. It reopened on 12 September 2020.

References

Metro stations in Hwaseong, Gyeonggi
Railway stations opened in 1937
1937 establishments in Korea